The Bay Head School District is a community public school district that serves students in kindergarten through eighth grade from Bay Head, in Ocean County, New Jersey, United States.

As of the 2017–18 school year, the district and its one school had an enrollment of 129 students and 15.2 classroom teachers (on an FTE basis), for a student–teacher ratio of 8.5:1. The district has been ranked as one of the smallest in the state.

The district is classified by the New Jersey Department of Education as being in District Factor Group "I", the second-highest of eight groupings. District Factor Groups organize districts statewide to allow comparison by common socioeconomic characteristics of the local districts. From lowest socioeconomic status to highest, the categories are A, B, CD, DE, FG, GH, I and J.

Students in public school for ninth through twelfth grades attend Point Pleasant Beach High School in Point Pleasant Beach, as part of a sending/receiving relationship with the Point Pleasant Beach School District, together with students from Lavallette and Mantoloking. As of the 2017–18 school year, the high school had an enrollment of 364 students and 36.9 classroom teachers (on an FTE basis), for a student–teacher ratio of 9.9:1.

History
Bay Head School was flooded in October 2012 when Superstorm Sandy hit New Jersey. First Response Disaster Restoration Specialists mobilized from Indiana to expedite the restoration process.

School
Bay Head Elementary School had an enrollment of 129 students in the 2017–18 school year.
Frank Camardo, Principal

Administration
Core members of the district's administration are:
Dr. Pete Morris, Superintendent
Pat Christopher, Business Administrator / Board Secretary

The district's board of education has five members who set policy and oversee the fiscal and educational operation of the district through its administration. As a Type II school district, the board's trustees are elected directly by voters to serve three-year terms of office on a staggered basis, with either one or two seats up for election each year held (since 2012) as part of the November general election.

References

External links
Bay Head Elementary School
 
School Data for the Bay Head Elementary School, National Center for Education Statistics

Bay Head, New Jersey
New Jersey District Factor Group I
School districts in Ocean County, New Jersey
Public K–8 schools in New Jersey